Mary Jo, various spelled Mari Jo, Mary Joe and similar, is a feminine given name found mainly in the United States. It is often a contraction of Mary Josephine, Mary Joanna or similar.

Notable people with the name include:

 Mary Jo Baedecker (born 1941), American geochemist
 Mary Jo Bane, American political scientist
 Mary Jo Bang (born 1946), American poet
 Mary Jo Bona, American literary scholar
 Mary Jo Bole (born 1956), American artist
 Mari Jo Buhle (born 1943), American historian
 Mary Jo Buttafuoco (born 1955), American author and motivational speaker
 Mary Jo Catlett (born 1938), American actress
 Mary Jo Chelette (1939–1984), American country singer
 Mary Jo Codey (born 1955), American healthcare activist
 Maryjo Cohen, American business executive
 Mary Jo Daley (born 1949), American politician
 Mary Jo Deschanel (born 1945), American actress
 Mary Jo Duffy (born 1954), American comic book editor and writer
 Mary Jo Estep (1909 or 1910—1992), Shoshone massacre survivor 
 Mary Jo Eustace (born 1962), Canadian actress and chef
 Mary Joe Fernández (born 1971), American tennis player
 Mary Jo Fisher (born 1962), Australian politician
 Mary Jo Foley, American writer
 Mary Jo Freshley (born 1934), American Korean dance instructor
 Mary Joe Frug (1941–1991), American legal scholar
 Mary Jo Haddad, Canadian nurse and health care executive
 Mary Jo Heath (born 1954), American radio music host
 Mary Jo Keenen, American actress
 Mary Jo Kilroy (born 1949), American attorney and politician
 Mary Jo Kopechne (1940–1969), American secretary
 Mary Jo Leddy, (born 1946), Canadian writer and activist
 Mary Jo Markey, American television and film editor
 Mary Jo McGuire (born 1956), American politician
 MariJo Moore, American writer
 Mary-Jo Morell (born 1937), nom de plume of German writer Doris Gercke
 Mary Jo Nye (born 1944), American historian of science
 Mary Jo Ondrechen (born 1953), American chemist
 Mary Jo Pehl (born 1960), American writer, actress, and comedian
 Mary Jo Peppler (born 1944), American volleyball player and coach
 Mary Jo Perino, American television sports journalist
 Mary Jo Podgurski, American healthcare educator
 Mary Jo Putney, American author
 Mary Jo Randle (born 1954), English actress
 Mari-Jo P. Ruiz, Filipina mathematician
 Mary Jo Salter (born 1954), American poet
 Mary Jo Sanders (born 1974), American boxer
 Mary Jo Slater (born 1946), American casting director and producer
 Mary-Jo Starr (born 1959), stage name of Australian actress, director and singer Kaarin Fairfax
 Mary Jo Tarola (1928–2017), birth name of American model and actress Linda Douglas
 Mary Jo Taylor (born 1953), American politician
 Mary Jo Tiampo (born 1962), American freestyle skier
 Mary Jo Watson, Seminole art historian
 Mary Jo White (born 1947), American attorney and civil servant
 Mary Jo White (Pennsylvania politician) (born 1941), American state senator
 Mary Jo Wilhelm (born 1955), American politician
 Mary Jo Wills (born 1951), American diplomat
 Mary-Jo Wormell (born 1947), birth name of British writer Mary Lyons

Fictional characters with the name include:
 Mari Jo Mason, a The Young and the Restless character from the 1990s
 Mary Jo Shively, a Designing Women character

Feminine given names